The Celestial City is a 1929 British silent crime film directed by J. O. C. Orton and starring Norah Baring, Cecil Fearnley and Lewis Dayton. The film was made at Welwyn Studios by British Instructional Films, and based on the 1926 The Celestial City by Emma Orczy.

Cast
 Norah Baring as Lita 
 Cecil Fearnley as Sir Philip Charteris 
 Lewis Dayton as Paul Sergine 
 Malvina Longfellow as Princess Brokska 
 Henri De Vries as Bill 
 Frank Perfitt as Sir John Errick 
 Albert Rebla as Laddie 
 Gordon Begg as Truscott

References

Bibliography
 Low, Rachael. History of the British Film, 1918-1929. George Allen & Unwin, 1971.

External links

1929 films
1929 crime films
British crime films
1920s English-language films
Films directed by J. O. C. Orton
British silent feature films
Films based on British novels
Films shot at Welwyn Studios
British black-and-white films
1920s British films